Musyari (Punjabi,  is a village and union council of Murree Tehsil in the Murree District of Punjab, Pakistan.

It is located in the south central area of the tehsil to the south of Murree. According to the 1998 census of Pakistan it had a population of 9,945.
    
The major tribes of the Union Council include the (Dhund Abbasis) Behramals and The Parhals with such distribution that the village Musyari which located in south of Murree city houses the Brave parhals along with the villages of Mohra, Batnara and Pangan (in south of Jhika Gali), whilst the villages of Bara Hoter, Sambal Bia, Phaphril, Ghora and Saen are inhabited by behramals. The Union Council has a scenic beauty of a dale, as the River Soan bisects the two population hubs. There are behramal majority areas in the east of the river and parhal's majority areas in the west of the river.
       
The literacy rate in Union Council Musyari is substantial, and the rate is quite healthy in girls too. One High School for Boys, located in the village of Phaphirl, is meeting the education needs of the populace, it does not suffice albeit. The growing population of the area demand a Higher Secondary School and the existing School needs to be upgraded for the purpose. There are a number of middle and primary schools for boys and girls in the area, but a girls high school is still a remote possibility that eludes the desirous population for decades. The affluent parents prefer sending their children to better English medium schools in the Murree City.
The road net has substantially increased with the construction of Murree-Islamabad express way. However, the remote areas still roost in the dilapidated road conditions that aggravate each year owing to flashing monsoons.
Being a resident of the area, it is scribed with great confidence and first hand knowledge that the area needs lot of governmental attention for afforestation, as due to the swelling deforestation trends coupled with the growing trends of urbanization the forests have shrunk to the far off suburbs of Union Council Musyari.

References

People From Musyari 

Kashif Abbasi
Muztar Abbasi
Mohammad_Wasim

Union councils of Murree Tehsil
Populated places in Murree Tehsil